The 1975 Holy Cross Crusaders football team was an American football team that represented the College of the Holy Cross as an independent during the 1975 NCAA Division I football season. Ed Doherty returned for his fifth year as head coach. The team compiled a record of 1–10.

All home games were played at Fitton Field on the Holy Cross campus in Worcester, Massachusetts.

Schedule

Statistical leaders
Statistical leaders for the 1975 Crusaders included: 
 Rushing: Steve Hunt, 688 yards and 2 touchdowns on 173 attempts
 Passing: Bob Martin, 1,486 yards, 110 completions and 7 touchdowns on 234 attempts
 Receiving: Dave Quehl, 959 yards and 5 touchdowns on 63 receptions
 Scoring: Dave Quehl, 30 points from 5 touchdowns
 Total offense: Bob Martin, 1,398 yards (1,486 passing, minus-88 rushing)
 All-purpose yards: Dave Quehl, 966 yards (959 receiving, 8 returning, minus-1 rushing)
 Interceptions: Jim Coughlin, 3 interceptions for 14 yards

References

Holy Cross
Holy Cross Crusaders football seasons
Holy Cross Crusaders football